The first election to the Representative Assembly of French India (French: Assemblée Représentative des Indes Françaises) was held on 15 December 1946 to constitute the First Representative Assembly of French India. The election included Pondichéry (with 22 seats), Karaikal (12 seats), Chandernagor (5 seats), Mahé (3 seats) and Yanaon (2 seats). The election was won by the National Democratic Front of Deiva Zivarattinam, that won 30 out of 44 seats.

Results in Yanaon

See also
1951 French India Representative Assembly election
1955 Pondicherry Representative Assembly election
1959 Pondicherry Representative Assembly election

References

State Assembly elections in Puducherry
Elections in France
1946 elections in India
1946 in French India
1940s in Pondicherry